Colin Tabeart is a British philatelist and philatelic writer. He is a specialist in postal routes and rates. He was appointed to the Roll of Distinguished Philatelists in 2017.

Selected publications
 United Kingdom Letter Rates, Inland and Overseas, 1635 to 1900. C. Tabeart, Fareham, 1989. (2nd 2003)
 Robertson Revisited: A Study of the Maritime Postal Markings of the British Isles Based on the Work of Alan W.Robertson. James Bendon, Cyprus, 1997. 
Admiralty Mediterranean Steam Packets 1830 to 1857. James Bendon, Cyprus, 2002. 
 Australia New Zealand UK mails to 1880: Rates routes and ships out and home. C. Tabeart, Fareham, 2004. (2nd 2011) 
  "Australia New Zealand UK mails Vol 2 1881-1900: Rates routes and ships out and home. C. Tabeart, Fareham,
 British West African mail packets to 1900: Rates, routes and ships out and home''. West Africa Study Circle, 2015. 
  "British Long Distance Mail Packets 1793-1815" C Tabeart, Fareham

References

British philatelists
Living people
Signatories to the Roll of Distinguished Philatelists
Philatelic authors
Year of birth missing (living people)